Ffion Alys Morgan (born 11 May 2000) is a Welsh footballer who plays as a defender for Bristol City and the Wales women's national team. She began her career with Ammanford and Cardiff City, before joining Coventry United in 2019. She made her international debut for Wales in 2017.

Early life
Born in Wales, Morgan attended Ysgol Tre-Gib in Llandeilo as a teenager.

Club career
Morgan began playing football at the age of four for local youth side Saron Juniors. At the age of 11, she joined Ammanford Girls. Morgan later signed for Cardiff City but missed the 2017–18 campaign after suffering a serious anterior cruciate ligament (ACL) injury while on international duty for Wales under-19s. In September 2019, she joined FA Women's Championship side Coventry United. In July 2020, she signed for Crystal Palace.

International career
Morgan has been capped for the Wales national team, appearing for the team during the 2019 FIFA Women's World Cup qualifying cycle. She made her debut for the senior squad against Northern Ireland in 2017.

Personal life
Morgan is bilingual, able to speak both Welsh and English. Alongside playing football, she also holds a UEFA B Licence in coaching.

Notes

References

External links
 
 
 , part 1
 , part 2

2000 births
Living people
Welsh women's footballers
Wales women's international footballers
Women's association football midfielders
Crystal Palace F.C. (Women) players
Bristol City W.F.C. players
Coventry United W.F.C. players
Cardiff City Ladies F.C. players